Wallington, is a toponymic surname derived from a common English place name.  The name "Wallington" derives from the Anglo Saxon "Waletone" meaning "village of the Britons".

People with the surname
 George Wallington, American musician
 James Wallington, American boxer
 Mark Wallington (writer), British author
 Nehemiah Wallington, English Puritan